Mysterium Magnum is Latin for "great mystery" and has several different associations and usages.

Paracelsus

Paracelsus and other alchemists employed the term "Mysterium Magnum" to denote primordial undifferentiated matter, from which all the Classical Elements sprang, sometimes compared with Brahman, aether and akasha.

Jakob Böhme

Jakob Böhme (1575–November 17, 1624) a German Christian mystic wrote a treatise entitled The Mysterium Magnum (1623).

Sacrament

"Mysterium Magnum" is often employed in Christian theology as a euphemism for "sacrament".

See also
 Eucharist
 Great Rite
 Hieros gamos
 Mystery religion
 O magnum mysterium
 Philosopher's stone
 Sacred Mysteries
 Wakan Tanka

References

Alchemical concepts